Blackboard vs Whiteboard is a 2019 Indian Hindi-language film, which is directed by Tarun s Bisht and produced by Nupur Shrivastava, Gireesh Tiwary and Ashutosh Singh Ratan. The film  stars Raghuvir Yadav, Ashok Samarth, Dharmendra Singh, Alismita Goswami, Akhilendra Mishra and Pankaj Jha in lead roles. The story of this film is based the education system. It is set to release on 12 April 2019.

Cast 
 Raghuvir Yadav as Dinanath
 Ashok Samarth as Mukhiya Gajraj Singh
 Akhilendra Mishra as Lawyer Tripathi
 Abhavya Sharma as Pinky
 Pankaj Jha as Mishri
 Alismita Goswami as Rashmi
 Dharmendra Singh as Amit
 Ashutosh Singh Ratan		
 Dharmendra		
 Madhu Roy as Punita
 Ashish Mishra as Gopal
 Manu Krishna as Hemraj Singh Hemu

Soundtrack 

The music of the film was composed by Jayant Aryan with lyrics written by Surya Sharma Samudra, Roop Agarwal and Gireesh Tiwary.

References

External links 
 
 

2019 films
2010s Hindi-language films